James Jardine (29 January 1794 – 13 January 1872) was an English cricketer with amateur status. He was associated with Kent and made his first-class debut in 1827. He was a contractor by profession, his family being connected with the railways.

References

1794 births
1872 deaths
English cricketers
English cricketers of 1826 to 1863
Kent cricketers
Married v Single cricketers